The 48th Scripps National Spelling Bee was held in Washington, D.C. at the Mayflower Hotel on June 4–5, 1975, sponsored by the E.W. Scripps Company.

The winner was 14-year-old Hugh Tosteson García of Puerto Rico, who correctly spelled "incisor" in the 27th round for the win. Garcia was the first winner from outside the fifty states of the United States, and the only such winner until the 1998 Bee. Second place went to 14-year-old Mark Ogle of Greenwood, Indiana, who missed "brilliantine". Only the two contestants were left after the 20th round.

A total of 597 words were used in the competition, the same as the prior year. There were 79 contestants this year. On the first day of competition, 47 spellers fell out during six rounds of competition which used 400 words, leaving 32 spellers for the final day of competition.

References

Scripps National Spelling Bee competitions
1975 in Washington, D.C.
1975 in education
June 1975 events in the United States